Chidan (also Romanized as Chīdan and Chīden) is a village in Mongasht Rural District, in the Central District of Bagh-e Malek County, Khuzestan Province, Iran. At the 2006 census, its population was 1,490, in 247 families.

References 

Populated places in Bagh-e Malek County